Adolf Gundersen (October 8, 1865 – September 15, 1938) was a Norwegian born, American physician and founder of Gundersen Lutheran Medical Center.

Background
Adolf Gundersen was born in the parish of Åsnes in the traditional region of Solør in the county of Hedmark, Norway. He received his professional training in Norway and graduated from the Royal University of Oslo in 1890.

Career
Gundersen came to La Crosse, Wisconsin to join the medical practice of Christian Christensen. In 1893, he married Helga Sara Isaksetre (1867–1951), with whom he had eight children.
Four of the sons, Gunnar, Alf, Sigurd B. Sr. and Thorolf, joined their father in his first clinic, which opened in 1930 on the outskirts of the city. In 1944, Gundersen's physician sons created Gundersen Medical Foundation (now the foundation supporting Gundersen Health System). His eldest son, Borge, was in charge of Røisen, the Gundersen estate in Solør, Norway.

Dr. Gundersen received Knighthood in the Royal Norwegian Order of St. Olaf, first rank, from King Haakon of Norway in 1926. He was made an honorary member of The Medical Society of Oslo (Det norske medicinske Selskab) in 1933. He was a Fellow of the American College of Surgeons and in the Scandinavian Surgical Society, an honorary member of the Christiania Surgical Society. He was also a Regent of the University of Wisconsin System. Dr. Gundersen was inducted into the Wisconsin Business Hall of Fame in 2013.

Quotation

References

Other sources
Bergland, Betty A.; Lori Ann Lahlum (2011) Norwegian American Women: Migration, Communities, and Identities (Minnesota Historical Society) 
Hessel, Susan T. (1991) Medicine, the Gundersen experience, 1891-1991 (Gundersen Clinic, La Crosse, Wisconsin) 
Midelfort, H. Christine A Norwegian Immigrant's Accommodation To America: The Early Letters of Dr. Adolf Gundersen (Peninsula Nordic Study Circle Lecture Series. 2005–2006)
Orgensen, Ole (1982) Adolf Gundersen og hans sønner" (Nordmanns-Forbundet, 90–93)
Strand, A. E. (1905) A History of the Norwegians of Illinois (Chicago: John Anderson Publishing Company)

External links
Adolf and Helga Gundersen Bronze Sculpture, Gundersen Lutheran Medical Center

1865 births
1938 deaths
Norwegian surgeons
Physicians from Wisconsin
American surgeons
People from La Crosse, Wisconsin
People from Åsnes
Norwegian emigrants to the United States
Recipients of the St. Olav's Medal